The Detroit Diesel Series 71 is a two-stroke diesel engine series, available in both inline and V configurations, manufactured by Detroit Diesel.

Inline models included one, two, three, four and six cylinders, and the V-types six, eight, 12, 16 and 24 cylinders. 

The two largest V units used multiple cylinder heads per bank to keep the head size and weight to manageable proportions, the V-16 using four heads from the four-cylinder inline model and the V-24 using four heads from the inline six-cylinder model. This feature also assisted in keeping down the overall cost of these large engines by maintaining parts commonality with the smaller models.

History
The inline six-cylinder 71 series engine was introduced as the initial flagship product of the Detroit Diesel Engine Division of General Motors in 1938. The V-type first appeared in 1957. 

Sales of The 71 Series ceased in the summer of 1995, with the four stroke Detroit Diesel engine introduced as a replacement.

Design

Inline models were famously "symmetrical", meaning that blower, exhaust, water manifold, starter, and other components could be mounted on either side of the basic block to fit a particular application. A number of models could also run with the crankshaft turning either clockwise or counter-clockwise, called "Right Hand" or "Left Hand" rotation engines (as viewed from the front of the engine). The less-common Left Hand engines were typically used in buses, because the rotation matched rear-engined transverse installations. Boats equipped with two engines would typically use one Left Hand and one Right Hand, so that the torque from the propellers would cancel each other out, without the need for a complex reversing gear on one side.

As a two-stroke diesel engine that does not use crankcase aspiration cannot naturally draw in combustion air, the blower is inherently necessary to charge the cylinders with air for combustion. The blower also assists in scavenging spent combustion gasses at the end of the power stroke. All Series 71 engines use uniflow scavenging, in which a gear-driven Roots blower mounted to the exterior of the engine provides intake air through cored passages in the engine block and ports in the cylinder walls at slightly greater than atmospheric pressure. The engine exhausts through pushrod-operated poppet valves in the cylinder head(s), with either two or four valves per cylinder. Unit fuel injection is employed, one injector per cylinder, with no high fuel pressure outside of the injector body. The injectors are cycled from the same camshaft responsible for opening the exhaust valves.

Nomenclature

The first number refers to the number of cylinders in the engine, followed by a hyphen or "V", indicating inline or vee, respectively, then 71 for the Series designation, referring  the nominal displacement per cylinder in cubic inches (rounding up ). 

Like most Detroit Diesel two-cycle engines, the 71 Series are equipped with a blower yet still referred to as "naturally aspirated" (SAE designation). These do not have a model suffix identifier: 6-71 is an inline 6. When the model number includes a suffix, it denotes additional features. Engines equipped with needle unit fuel injectors and commonly four exhaust valves per cylinder are indicated by the suffix "N", so for the V8, 8V-71N. Later versions were available with turbochargers, which discharged directly into the Roots blower intake; these have a "T" suffix, and with aftercooling, a "TA", so 8V-71T or 8V-71TA. "TT" indicates Tailored Torque and "TTA" Tailored Torque Aftercooled. These models are designated for economy (Fuel Squeezer) and constant horsepower ratings.

Applications

The most popular incarnations of the series 71 engine as used for highway vehicle applications included the inline 6-71, the V-block 6V-71 (both widely used in transit buses) and the 8V-71 V-8. In addition to motorcoach propulsion, both inline and V types have found extensive usage in school buses, trucks, fire apparatus, motor homes, construction and industrial machinery, a few farm tractors, commercial fishing vessels, and military vehicles and equipment.

The 71 series is very popular in marine applications, not only as a propulsion engine in small craft (Gray Marine 6-71) but as auxiliary power to drive generators, winches and other heavy shipboard machinery.
The Detroit inline 6-71 engine, in all of its variations, was also available as a 'pancake engine' (here variably called either 6L-71 or 6N-71) for horizontal (underfloor) mount applications, such as on larger Crown and Gillig school buses and articulated puller transit buses (such as the Crown-Ikarus 286). Many 4-71 engines were used in various types of construction equipment, such as Galion highway graders.  

The 6-cylinder version was also used in the Victorian Railways DERM railmotor.

Variants

Model numbers

Further developments

WWII General Motors 6004/6046 engine  
The inline 6-71 was adapted to British requirements as the power plant for Canadian (and later British) built Valentine tanks where it was known as the GMC 6004, orders being placed in late September 1940.

The 6046 Diesel was a twin engine setup used by US and British tanks and tank destroyers.
The M3A3 (Lee IV/Lee V) and M3A5 (Grant II) variants of the M3 tank 
M4A2 variant of the M4 Sherman tank
M10 tank destroyer and the re-gunned British variant the 17pdr SP Achilles
M36B2 variant of the M36 tank destroyer

Detroit diesel 6051 quad-71
The Detroit diesel 6051 quad-71 was a Detroit Diesel Series 6-71 side by side tandem engine setup of two banks of four engines each driving two propeller shafts in Landing Craft Infantry LCI(L).

Soviet/Russian copies
In the Soviet Union / Russia, various versions of this engine-type were produced at the YaAZ automobile factory in Yaroslavl. Throughout World War II, the 4-71 engine both in locally assembled form (built by Lend-Lease provided American industrial equipment) and from USA-supplied kits had been used for Ya-12 light artillery tractors. After 1945, the 4-71 engine entered production in a slightly modified configuration (deuniversalization, conversion to metric units, a more powerful preheater) to suit the conditions of the Soviet Union branded "YaAZ-204". After 1947 the factory used a copy of the 6-71 engine branded "YaAZ-206" in the heavy trucks YaAZ-210 and YaAZ-214 built from 1951 to 1959. The vehicle production was transferred to KrAZ in Kremenchuk, Ukraine in 1959, where trucks with newer versions of the YaAZ-206 stood in production until the appearance of the four-stroke V8-engined KrAZ-255 in 1967.

See also
 List of Detroit Diesel products

References

Sources 
Shelton, Chris. "Then, Now, and Forever" in Hot Rod, March 2017, pp.16-29.

71
Two-stroke diesel engines
Straight-twin engines
Straight-three engines
Straight-four engines
Straight-six engines
V6 engines
V8 engines
V12 engines
V16 engines
Diesel engines by model